Rodrigo Javier Lemos Rosende (born 3 October 1973, in Las Piedras) is a Uruguayan former footballer. He last played for Centro Deportivo Social Liverpool, a semi-amateur team from Canelones, Uruguay.

Club career
Lemos spent most of his career playing for Nacional and Bella Vista in the Primera División Uruguaya. He also played with Pumas in the Primera División de México.

International career
Lemos made eight appearances for the senior Uruguay national football team from 1996 to 2001.

Lemos also played at the 1993 FIFA World Youth Championship in Australia.

References

External links
 

1973 births
Living people
People from Las Piedras, Uruguay
Uruguayan footballers
Uruguay under-20 international footballers
Uruguay international footballers
2001 Copa América players
Club Nacional de Football players
C.A. Bella Vista players
Liverpool F.C. (Montevideo) players
Tianjin Jinmen Tiger F.C. players
Club Universidad Nacional footballers
Audax Italiano footballers
Uruguayan Primera División players
Liga MX players
Expatriate footballers in China
Expatriate footballers in Chile
Expatriate footballers in Mexico
Uruguayan expatriate sportspeople in China
Uruguayan expatriate sportspeople in Chile
Uruguayan expatriate sportspeople in Mexico
Association football midfielders
Uruguayan expatriate footballers